Adrián Sardinero Corpa (born 13 October 1990) is a Spanish footballer who plays for Australian club Perth Glory FC as a winger.

Club career
Sardinero was born in Leganés, Madrid. After emerging through local Getafe CF's youth ranks, he made his senior debut in 2008, helping the B team to promote to Segunda División B for the first time ever in his second year.

On 30 September 2010, one month before his 20th birthday, Sardinero made his debut for the main squad, playing 20 minutes in a 2–0 away loss against BSC Young Boys in the group stage of the UEFA Europa League. One month later, in a home fixture against the same Swiss opponent – in the same competition – he scored the game's only goal, all this before having appeared in La Liga for the club.

Sardinero scored his first Spanish top-flight goal on 2 April 2011, netting in the last minutes of a 2–4 home defeat to Valencia CF after coming on as a substitute for Borja Fernández midway through the second half. For the 2011–12 season, both he and teammate Alberto Escassi were loaned to Segunda División side Hércules CF.

On 10 July 2012, Sardinero (and Escassi) signed permanently with Hércules, penning a three-year contract. From 2014 and over six seasons, after their relegation from the second tier, he competed in the Cypriot First Division.

Sardinero joined OFI Crete F.C. of the Super League Greece on 22 June 2020, on a two-year contract. The 30-year-old switched clubs and countries one year later, agreeing to a two-year deal at Perth Glory FC in the A-League.

Career statistics

References

External links

1990 births
Living people
People from Leganés
Spanish footballers
Footballers from the Community of Madrid
Association football wingers
La Liga players
Segunda División players
Segunda División B players
Tercera División players
Getafe CF B players
Getafe CF footballers
Hércules CF players
Cypriot First Division players
AEL Limassol players
Apollon Limassol FC players
Super League Greece players
OFI Crete F.C. players
A-League Men players
Perth Glory FC players
Spanish expatriate footballers
Expatriate footballers in Cyprus
Expatriate footballers in Greece
Expatriate soccer players in Australia
Spanish expatriate sportspeople in Cyprus
Spanish expatriate sportspeople in Greece
Spanish expatriate sportspeople in Australia